The following is a list of curling clubs in the Czech Republic. They are organized by the Czech Curling Association, a member of the World Curling Federation.

1. CK Brno - Brno
Curling Brno - Brno
SKN Brno - Brno
1. KCK Trutnov - Trutnov
Handicap Sport Club Velké Meziříčí - Velké Meziříčí
CC Citadela - Prague
CC Savona - Prague
CC Letící Kameny - Prague
CC Kolibris - Prague
CC Silscrap Zlatá Praha - Prague
Klub z Viktorky - Prague
CC Dion - Prague
CC Kladno - Kladno
Valící se šutráky - Brno
Curling skid club Sušice - Sušice
CC Zbraslav - Prague
CC Prague Tee Party - Prague
CC Demion - Prague
Relax sport club Zbraslav - Prague
Rychlopalná košťata - Brno
CC Ledoborci - Prague
CC Sokol Liboc - Prague
CC Riper - Hradec Králové
CC Karviná - Karviná
VSK Přírodověda - Prague
CC Loupežníci Jičín - Jičín
Pražský lední club - Prague
Sportovní Club Jedličkova Ústavu O.S. - Prague
CC Meteorite Z.S.
CC Kamenný Újezd
Centrum Třešnovka Z.S. - Žabovřesky

References

Czech RepublicLists of cu
 
Curling